Group IID secretory phospholipase A2 is an enzyme that in humans is encoded by the PLA2G2D gene.

References

Further reading